Birgit Blum (born 7 January 1968) is a Liechtenstein judoka. She competed at the 1992 Summer Olympics and the 1996 Summer Olympics.

References

External links
 

1968 births
Living people
Liechtenstein female judoka
Olympic judoka of Liechtenstein
Judoka at the 1992 Summer Olympics
Judoka at the 1996 Summer Olympics
Place of birth missing (living people)